Nechyporenko/Nechiporenko, also Nychyporenko/Nichiporenko, is a Ukrainian surname. Other transliterations include Nečiporenko and Ničiporenko.

Notable people with the surname or one of its variants: 
 Anastasiya Nychyporenko (born 1995), Ukrainian-Moldovan biathlete
 Denys Nechyporenko (born 1990), Ukrainian athlete
 Oleg Nechiporenko (born 1932), Soviet intelligence operative

Ukrainian-language surnames